The laced moray (Gymnothorax favagineus), also known as the leopard moray, leopard moray eel, tessellate moray or honeycomb moray, is a species of marine fish in the family Muraenidae.

Description

Gymnothorax favagineus is a large moray which can reach a maximum length of 300 cm, but specimens usually encountered are much smaller.
Its serpentine in shape body has a white to yellowish background color dotted with numerous black spots which latter vary in size and shape depending on the individual and on the environment in which the animals live.
Therefore, morays living on a reef with clear water will have less black spots than those of a turbid environment.
It is from this characteristic color pattern that ensue its vernacular names.

Distribution and habitat
The laced moray is widespread throughout the Indo-West Pacific area from eastern coast of Africa, Red Sea included, until Papua New Guinea and from south Japan to the Great Barrier Reef.

It lives on the outer slopes of coral reefs. During the day, it sits sheltered in crevices between 3.3 and 148.5 feet (1 and 45 meters) deep.

Biology
The laced moray is carnivorous. It leaves its lair at night to actively hunt its prey along the reef.
It feeds mainly on small fish and cephalopods. Large adults are prone to be aggressive in the wild.

References

External links

 Marinespecies.org: Gymnothorax favagineus
 Fishes of Australia : Gymnothorax favagineus
 
 
 

laced moray
Marine fish of Northern Australia
laced moray
laced moray
laced moray